German submarine U-709 was a Type VIIC U-boat of Nazi Germany's Kriegsmarine during World War II.

Ordered 15 August 1940, she was laid down on 5 May 1941 and launched 14 April 1942. From 12 August 1942 until 2 December 1943, she was commanded by Oberleutnant zur See Karl-Otto Weber, then captained by Oberleutnant zur See Rudolf Ites from 3 December 1943 until 19 February 1944.

Design
German Type VIIC submarines were preceded by the shorter Type VIIB submarines. U-709 had a displacement of  when at the surface and  while submerged. She had two shafts and two  propellers.

U-709 was fitted with five  torpedo tubes (four fitted at the bow and one at the stern), fourteen torpedoes, one  SK C/35 naval gun, 220 rounds, and two twin  C/30 anti-aircraft guns. The boat had a complement of between forty-four and sixty.

Service history
U-709 had five patrols, from 12 August 1942 until 19 February 1944, during which she sank no ships.

Wolfpacks
U-709 took part in 15 wolfpacks, namely:
 Westmark (6 – 11 March 1943) 
 Amsel (22 April – 3 May 1943) 
 Amsel 3 (3 – 6 May 1943) 
 Rhein (7 – 10 May 1943) 
 Elbe 1 (10 – 14 May 1943) 
 Without name (11 – 29 July 1943) 
 Siegfried (22 – 27 October 1943) 
 Siegfried 3 (27 – 30 October 1943) 
 Jahn (30 October – 2 November 1943) 
 Tirpitz 4 (2 – 8 November 1943) 
 Eisenhart 6 (9 – 13 November 1943) 
 Schill 2 (17 – 22 November 1943) 
 Igel 2 (3 – 17 February 1944) 
 Hai 1 (17 – 22 February 1944) 
 Preussen (22 February – 1 March 1944)

Fate
She has been missing since 19 February 1944 in the North Atlantic. No explanation for its loss. All hands lost.

Previously recorded fate
Niestlé disagreed with the official account, and conclude that there was no known explanation for its loss.

References

Bibliography

External links

German Type VIIC submarines
U-boats commissioned in 1942
1942 ships
U-boats sunk in 1944
World War II submarines of Germany
Ships built in Hamburg
Missing U-boats of World War II
U-boats sunk by depth charges
U-boats sunk by US warships
World War II shipwrecks in the Atlantic Ocean
Ships lost with all hands
Maritime incidents in March 1944